Thanjavur Air Force Station  of the Indian Air Force (IAF) is located in Thanjavur in Tamil Nadu, India. It is home to a No. 222 squadron of the IAF's Sukhoi Su-30 MKI fighter aircraft - the first IAF fighter squadron in Southern India. The facility was expected to start functioning by 2012. However, the schedule was delayed and the airbase was inaugurated on 27 May 2013 by then Defence Minister A. K. Antony. As of 2019 it operates a squadron of Sukhoi Su-30 MKI.

History 
The airfield was used by the Royal Air force during World War II as a base for its Lockheed Hudson, Vickers Wellington, Hawker Hurricane, and P-47 Thunderbolt aircraft. After the war the airfield was handed over to the government for civilian use and eventually came under the jurisdiction of the Airports Authority of India (AAI). In the early '90s, Thanjavur was connected with Chennai via the Vayudoot Flight Service, which was stopped due to poor patronage. The IAF took over the airfield in March 1990. During the heavy floods in Tamil Nadu in November 2008, IAF helicopters operating from Thanjavur dropped 15,000 kg of relief materials to the affected areas.

Facilities 
Recent aerial photography only shows extension of Runway 07/25 to 9000 feet with parallel taxiway and aprons under construction.

References

External links
 

Indian Air Force bases
Thanjavur
Airports in Tamil Nadu
1990 establishments in Tamil Nadu
Military installations established in 1990
20th-century architecture in India